Timothy J. McGarigle (born October 25, 1983) is a former professional American football linebacker in the National Football League. He was drafted by the St. Louis Rams in the seventh round of the 2006 NFL Draft. He played college football at Northwestern, where he is currently an assistant coach. He also played for the Florida Tuskers of the United Football League.

Early years
McGarigle played for Saint Tarcissus on the northwest side of Chicago throughout his grammar school career. He graduated from St. Patrick High School in Chicago. At St. Patrick he played linebacker, as well as running back.

College career
McGarigle played college football at Northwestern University where he set a then Football Bowl Subdivision record for most tackles in a career, with 545 total tackles. He graduated with a degree in communications studies.

Professional career

Pre-draft

St. Louis Rams
McGarigle was selected by the St. Louis Rams in the seventh round (221st overall) in the 2006 NFL Draft. He spent the 2006 season as a member of the practice squad. In 2007, McGarigle made the active roster and played 12 games. He was released from the Rams on September 3, 2008 and spent the rest of the year out of football.

Florida Tuskers
McGarigle was drafted by the Florida Tuskers of the United Football League in the UFL Premiere Season Draft in 2009. He signed with the team on August 17. In 2009, the Tuskers finished an undefeated regular season only to lose to the Las Vegas Locomotives in the 2009 UFL Championship Game. McGarigle was one of the team's defensive leaders, and recorded 34½ tackles, one sack, one interception, and a forced fumble. In March 2010, McGarigle was one of 20 players from the 2009 team chosen by Tuskers head coach Jay Gruden, as the team began to build its 2010 roster.

Coaching career
McGarigle joined the Northwestern coaching staff as a defensive graduate assistant in 2011, and then went on to coach linebackers at Western Michigan University. Following the 2015 season, he was hired to coach linebackers at the University of Illinois. He subsequently served as a defensive quality control coach for the Green Bay Packers. On January 4, 2018, it was announced that McGarigle would return to Northwestern as an assistant coach on Pat Fitzgerald's staff.

References

External links
Northwestern Wildcats bio

1983 births
Living people
Sportspeople from Chicago
Players of American football from Chicago
American football linebackers
Northwestern Wildcats football players
St. Louis Rams players
Florida Tuskers players
Northwestern Wildcats football coaches
Western Michigan Broncos football coaches
Illinois Fighting Illini football coaches
Green Bay Packers coaches